Keraia (Greek ), which literally means "horn", is a rare Greek word that may mean:
Keraia (Crete), a town of ancient Crete
Keraia (Pisidia), a town of ancient Pisidia
In modern Greek print, the keraia ( ʹ ) is used to distinguish numerals from letters
Something insignificant, a small projection, translated to English Tittle in Matthew 5:18